David Clements (born 20 September 1994) is an English ice hockey player for Coventry Blaze and the British national team.

He represented Great Britain at the 2021 IIHF World Championship and 2022 IIHF World Championship.

References

External links

1994 births
Living people
British expatriate ice hockey people
Coventry Blaze players
English expatriate sportspeople in Canada
English expatriate sportspeople in the United States
English ice hockey defencemen
Expatriate ice hockey players in Canada
Expatriate ice hockey players in the United States
Milton Keynes Lightning players
Telford Tigers players
Sportspeople from Coventry